The men's individual time trial (ITT) made its world championship debut on 25 August 1994 in Agrigento/Catania, Italy. It was added to the programme as a replacement for the team time trial.

The inaugural title was claimed by Chris Boardman, who also won the individual pursuit in that year's Track Cycling World Championships.

Final classification

References
the-sports.org

Men's time trial
UCI Road World Championships – Men's time trial